Jasmine Mary Joseph, known professionally as Meera Jasmine, is an Indian actress who appears primarily in Malayalam, Tamil, Telugu and Kannada language films.

Meera made her debut in 2001 with the Lohithadas film Soothradharan. She went on to star in various commercial and critically successful films in south Indian languages making her one of the most bankable and noteworthy actresses of the 2000s. She won the National Film Award for Best Actress in 2004 for her role in Paadam Onnu: Oru Vilapam, and is a two-time recipient of the Kerala State Film Award for Best Actress and a Tamil Nadu State Film Award. She also won the Kalaimamani Award from the Government of Tamil Nadu. and V. Shantaram Award. The Hindu once called her " One of the few actors who could hold her own among the stars and thespians of Malayalam Cinema".

Early life 
Meera Jasmine was born in Kuttapuzha village, Thiruvalla, Kerala to Joseph and Aleyamma. She was the fourth of five children.

She has two sisters, Jiby Sara Joseph and Jeny Susan Joseph, who has also acted in films, and two brothers, one of them, George worked as an assistant cinematographer. 

She completed her schooling in Bala Vihar, Thiruvalla and Marthoma Residential School, Thiruvalla. She appeared for her Higher Secondary Exams in March 2000. She had enrolled for a BSc degree in Zoology at Assumption College, Changanassery and completed nearly three months when she was spotted by director Blessy (who was then an assistant director to director Lohithadas) and offered a role in Soothradharan.

Meera had initially wanted to study and become a doctor and never had dreamed of becoming a film star. She stated, "I was just an ordinary girl. Never in my wildest dreams did I imagine being in films. I had not acted even in school plays. I never was the artistic type, I never thought I could dance, and I had not even thought of myself as being beautiful". She also said that Lohithadas "is like a father figure and my guru. He initiated me into films with Soothradharan and I owe it all to him".

Career

Malayalam
Meera Jasmine made her debut in the Malayalam film Soothradharan. Her second film was Gramophone, directed by Kamal, in which she appeared alongside Navya Nair and Dileep.

Her role as a Jewish girl was appreciated by Malayalam critics. Her third film was Swapnakkoodu, a romantic comedy alongside Prithviraj Sukumaran, Kunchako Boban, Jayasurya, and Bhavana under director Kamal. Her performance was appreciated and the film was a high commercial success. Among the five main characters, the one who scored the most was again Meera.

She rose to fame in Malayalam cinema with the film Kasthooriman directed by her mentor Lohithadas, where she played a happy go lucky yet emotionally complex character. She received her first Filmfare award for her performance in Kasthooriman. The film was a success at the box office, running for 100 days.

The same year, she acted in T. V. Chandran's acclaimed Padam Onnu Oru Vilapam. She played a 15-year-old Muslim girl who was forced to marry an older man, for which she was awarded a State Award and the National Award in addition with several other awards. It was followed by her performance as Raziya in Perumazhakkalam alongside Kavya Madhavan.

In the film Achuvinte Amma (2005), she enacted the young, adorable character Achu.

She then paired with Mohanlal in Rasathanthram (2006). She played as a girl pretending to be a boy due to the pressure of circumstances in the first half of the film . The film went on to become a commercial success. Her next film with Dileep – Vinodayathra, which again was directed by Sathyan Anthikkad. She was next featured opposite Mammootty in the critically acclaimed film Ore Kadal. The film was showcased in film festivals and won awards. Her performance as an innocent middle-class woman won praise from audiences. Media quoted her as, "Matching step with the megastar in this histrionic race is Meera Jasmine, who amazes you with a stunning delineation of her difficult role" . Her next film was Calcutta News with Dileep. Blessy, who introduced her to film field, was the director of Calcutta News. In Innathe Chintha Vishayam (2008), she collaborated with Sathyan Anthikkad for his fourth consecutive film, again opposite Mohanlal, but failed to succeed. Her next films Minnaminnikoottam with Kamal and Rathri Mazha with Lenin Rajendran, which released after a long post-production delay, were box office failures.

More than a year later, she played the role of a playback singer in Rajeev Anchal's Paattinte Palazhy. Though the film was commercially not successful, her character was noted and her performance gave her a comeback. Her next film, Four Friends, was a multi-starrer directed by Saji Surendran. She played the role of a cancer patient in this film. In the 2011 film Mohabbat, she played the lead role opposite Anand Michael and Munna. After a brief hiatus, she began committing films by late 2012. She was keen in choosing more women-centric roles and in Babu Janardhanan's Lisammayude Veedu, a sequel to the 2006 film Achanurangatha Veedu, her role was that of a serial rape victim. She acted opposite Mohanlal in Siddique's comedy film Ladies and Gentleman. Her latest project is Shajiyem's Ms. Lekha Tharoor Kanunnathu, a fantasy film. In 2014, she starred opposite Jayaram in Sugeeth's family film, Onnum Mindathe, but the film failed at the box office. She signed up for Ithinumappuram, a period film based in the 1970s, in which she plays a highly orthodox and rich Nair woman who falls in love with someone from a lower caste and gets married against her parents' will.

After that, she acted in the movie Mazhaneerthullikal directed by V. K. Prakash but the movie was not released. In 2016, she co-starred with Anoop Menon, Joju George and Kaniha in the crime thriller 10 Kalpanakal directed by Don Max, but the film was not a theatrical success. However, the film received rave reviews from critics and was praised for its script, direction and cast.

In 2018, Meera made a comeback after a gap of two years with a guest appearance in Kalidas Jayaram starrer Poomaram directed by Abrid Shine. After a long hiatus, in 2022 Meera joined hands with Sathyan Anthikad for a family entertainer 'Makal' alongside Jayaram. The film received decent reviews and Meera was praised for her subtle act.

Tamil
Meera Jasmine's Tamil debut was Run, directed by Lingusamy, which became a high success in Tamil Nadu and made her a sought-after actress. The success of Run and gave her the chance to work with the established actors of the Tamil film industry.

Though her successive films did not fare as well, she was noticed by director Mani Ratnam who gave her a role in Aayutha Ezhuthu. Meera, who did not know Tamil, worked on her diction and dubbed for herself in the film. She later appeared in N. Lingusamy's Sandakozhi and SS Stanley's Mercury Pookkal. Her latest Tamil film, Mambattiyan got released in December 2011.

Telugu and Kannada
Meera Jasmine became noted in the Telugu film industry with Run, the dubbed version of the same-titled Tamil film. She was in the Telugu films in 2004 with Ammayi Bagundi and Gudumba Shankar but also entered Kannada cinema by co-starring with Puneet Rajkumar in Maurya. Her Kannada film Arasu again with Puneet Rajkumar and Ramya is a hit. Her other Kannada films include Devaru Kotta Thangi and Ijjodu. Ijjodu, in which she played Chenni, a Basavi woman, who ends up becoming a sex worker, was screened at four prestigious domestic film festivals and garnered critical acclaim.

Meera Jasmine's biggest commercial success in Telugu remains Bhadra with Ravi Teja in the male lead. Her other Telugu films are Raraju, Maharadhi, Yamagola Malli Modalayindi, Gorintaku and Maa Ayana Chanti Pilladu, in which she is paired for a second time with Sivaji.

Personal life
In 2008, she said in an interview that she will be marrying Mandolin Rajesh, "but not for the next two or three years". Meera married to Anil John Titus on 9 February 2014 who works as an engineer in Dubai.

Controversy
In 2006, she offered prayers at Rajarajeshwara Temple at Taliparamba in Kerala where the entry of non-Hindus is prohibited. This led to a controversy and sparked off a protest by Hindu devotees. Later, she paid  as penalty to the temple authorities to conduct the purification rituals.

In 2008, she faced an unofficial ban in the Malayalam film industry issued by the Association of Malayalam Movie Artists (AMMA), after she refused to shoot for Twenty:20, a film distributed by actor Dileep for AMMA. Meera however said that she was not aware of a ban and that she was continuing shooting for Malayalam films.

Filmography

Awards and honours

References

External links
 

Indian film actresses
Living people
Actresses from Kerala
Kerala State Film Award winners
Best Actress National Film Award winners
People from Thiruvalla
Filmfare Awards South winners
21st-century Indian actresses
Actresses in Tamil cinema
Actresses in Telugu cinema
Actresses in Malayalam cinema
Actresses in Kannada cinema
Recipients of the Kalaimamani Award
1982 births
Women artists from Kerala